Gascoignella is a genus of sacoglossan sea slugs, marine gastropod mollusks in the family Platyhedylidae. This genus was first described in 1985 by Kathe Jensen.

Species
Species within the genus Gascoignella include:
 Gascoignella aprica Jensen, 1985
 Gascoignella jabae Swennen, 2001
 Gascoignella nukuli Swennen, 2001

References

Platyhedylidae